90th NBR Awards
Best Film: 
Green Book

The 90th National Board of Review Awards, honoring the best in film for 2018, were announced on November 27, 2018.

Top 10 Films 
Films listed alphabetically except top, which is ranked as Best Film of the Year:

Green Book
The Ballad of Buster Scruggs
Black Panther
Can You Ever Forgive Me?
Eighth Grade
First Reformed
If Beale Street Could Talk
Mary Poppins Returns
A Quiet Place
Roma
A Star Is Born

Top Foreign Films
Cold War
Burning
Custody
The Guilty
Happy as Lazzaro
Shoplifters

Top Documentaries
RBG
Crime + Punishment
Free Solo
Minding the Gap
Three Identical Strangers
Won't You Be My Neighbor?

Top Independent Films
The Death of Stalin
Lean on Pete
Leave No Trace
Mid90s
The Old Man & the Gun
The Rider
Searching
Sorry to Bother You
We the Animals
You Were Never Really Here

Winners
Best Film:
Green Book

Best Director:
Bradley Cooper, A Star Is Born

Best Actor:
Viggo Mortensen, Green Book

Best Actress:
Lady Gaga, A Star Is Born

Best Supporting Actor:
Sam Elliott, A Star Is Born

Best Supporting Actress:
Regina King, If Beale Street Could Talk

Best Original Screenplay:
Paul Schrader, First Reformed

Best Adapted Screenplay:
Barry Jenkins, If Beale Street Could Talk

Best Animated Feature:
Incredibles 2

Breakthrough Performance:
Thomasin McKenzie, Leave No Trace

Best Directorial Debut:
Bo Burnham, Eighth Grade

Best Foreign Language Film:
Cold War

Best Documentary:
RBG

Best Ensemble:
Crazy Rich Asians

William K. Everson Film History Award:
The Other Side of the Wind and They'll Love Me When I'm Dead

NBR Freedom of Expression:
22 July
On Her Shoulders

References

National Board of Review Awards
2018 film awards
2018 in American cinema